Steven Anthony Thompson (born 17 February 1972) is an English former footballer. He made two appearances in The Football League for Gillingham.

References

1972 births
Living people
Footballers from Manchester
English footballers
English Football League players
Gillingham F.C. players
Association football central defenders
Place of birth missing (living people)
20th-century English people